Zincke is a surname. Notable people with the surname include:

 Christian Friedrich Zincke, German painter
 Foster Barham Zincke (1817–1893), clergyman, traveler, and antiquary
 Georg Heinrich Zincke, German jurist and cameralist
 Theodor Zincke, German chemist

See also
Zinke